The Pons Cestius is an ancient Roman bridge connecting the right bank of the Tiber with the west of the Tiber Island in Rome, Italy. In Late Antiquity, the bridge was replaced and renamed the Pons Gratiani. It is also known as Ponte San Bartolomeo (lit=Bridge of Saint Bartholomew). No more than one third of the present stone bridge is of ancient material, as it was entirely rebuilt and extended in the 19th century, after numerous earlier restorations.

Ancient bridges

1st-century BC bridge 
The original bridge was built around the 1st century BC (some time between 62 and 27 BC), after the Pons Fabricius, which connects the other side of island to the river's left bank. The identity of the Cestius referred to in the bridge's name is unknown; he may have been responsible for building the bridge or for later restoring an existing one, and may have been a member of the gens Cestia during the later Roman Republic.

The Pons Cestius was the first bridge that reached the right bank of the Tiber from Tiber Island. Whereas the island was long connected with the left bank of the Tiber and the heart of ancient Rome, even before the Pons Fabricius was built, the right bank (Transtiber) remained unconnected until the Pons Cestius was constructed. Several members of the Cestii clan from the 1st century BC are known, but it is unknown which of them was responsible. The gens Cestia was not a prominent family until the time of Gaius Cestius Epulo, whose tomb, the Pyramid of Cestius, survives built into Rome's 3rd-century Aurelian Walls.

The Pons Cestius was restored during the reign of the emperor Antoninus Pius; an inscription commemorating the rebuilding was installed on the structure.

4th-century bridge 
In the 4th century the Pons Cestius was replaced by a new structure. According to the 5th century Latin historian Polemius Silvius, in 370 it was re-dedicated as the Pons Gratiani, to the brother-emperors Valentinian I and Valens and Valentinian's son Gratian, the reigning co-augusti of the Valentinianic dynasty. The bridge was rebuilt using volcanic tuff stone and peperino marble, with a facing of travertine limestone. Some of the rebuilding material came from the demolished porticus of the nearby Theatre of Marcellus. Inscriptions on marble panels commemorating the work and naming the emperors were installed on the bridge and on the parapet. The 4th-century bridge probably followed the architectural lines of its Republican predecessor. The bridge was  broad.

Both the pontes Cestius and Fabricius were long-living bridges; although the Fabricius remains wholly intact, the Ponte Cestio was restored several times from the 12th century and wholly dismantled and rebuilt in the 19th century, with only some of the ancient structure preserved.

Present bridge

19th-century rebuilding 

During the embankment of the Tiber's channel in 1888–1892, the building of the walls and boulevards (the lungoteveri) along the river necessitated the Roman bridge's demolition and the reconstruction of a new bridge. The ancient bridge, which had two small arches either side of the wide central span, was simply not long enough. The present bridge, with three large arches, was constructed in its stead, with its central arch reusing about two-thirds of the original material.

Two thirds of the present structure dates to this period, with the only around a third of the structure built from pre-modern material. The bridge's derives its connection with the saint of the New Testament from the church and minor basilica dedicated to Bartholomew the Apostle on Tiber Island.

See also
 
 List of Roman bridges
 Roman architecture
 Roman engineering

References

Sources

External links 
 LacusCurtius: Pons Cestius
 
 The Waters of Rome: Tiber River Bridges and the Development of the Ancient City of Rome
 Tiber Island information 

Bridges in Rome
Roman bridges in Italy
Deck arch bridges
Stone bridges in Italy
Bridges completed in the 1st century BC
Rome R. XIII Trastevere
Rome R. XII Ripa